Hangmen, Women and Soldiers is a propaganda film made by the German filmmaker Johannes Meyer in 1935. It was produced with the Bavaria film company in Munich. The screenplay was written by Max W. Kimmich and Jacob Geis after the novel A Fellow Named Prack written by Fritz Reck-Malleczewen.

Summary 
Cavalry captain Michael von Prack, a keen pilot from World War I, is taken prisoner by British troops in Asia Minor in 1918. However, he seizes the chance to escape to his homeland East Prussia with a ready-for-take-off British plane. At home, he gets involved in the post-war turmoil because meanwhile the war is over.

In a bar, Michael comes across a captain Eckau who is recruiting former regular soldiers to fight in a Freikorps by the side of the White movement against the Red Army despite the German surrender. Michael joins the troops and, at the same time, meets lovely Vera Iwanowna. She considers him to be his cousin, Russian general Alexej Alexandrowitsch von Prack, with whom she is in love, because the two men are as like as two peas. Alexej, who cannot stand his cousin Michael since their childhood, commands the Russian troops standing against the Freikorps.

While driving into the warzone, Michael re-meets Vera who is not only Alexej's lover, but also a Russian spy. Meanwhile, she has learned that he is Alexejs German cousin, but nevertheless spends a night with him before returning to the Russian headquarters.

When Alexej learns that Vera has met his hated cousin who is commander of the enemy's troops, he swears him death and sets a trap for the Freikorps by luring them into a swamp. In this situation he demands Michael to meet him personally, and the two men fight against each other. Alexej dies through the fight, Michael gets severely wounded.

Because the latter does not wear his uniform jacket, the Russians consider him to be the general and take him to their headquarters. Although Vera recognizes him immediately, Michael is able to act as the general and to discover important military secrets. He also gives the Russians orders that in fact improve the situation of the Freikorps.

Meanwhile, Vera is wavering between love and patriotism. Finally she reveals everything to the Russian commissar because her patriotism is stronger than her love to Michael. The latter is, however, able to escape and to return to his soldiers before being arrested.

Now that they know the deployment plans of the Russians, the Freikorps attacks them from the back. Michael is killed during the fights, Vera dies when the Freikorps fires at the Russian headquarters.

Background 
This film was made to defend the deployment of Freikorps in armed conflicts. It passed censorship on 11 December 1935 and was first shown to the public a week later. The movie was rewarded "artificially valuable" by film checkers of the propaganda ministry. (This attribute was given to films that fulfilled special aesthetic criteria besides the actors´ performances. It meant that cinemas had to pay less entertainment tax when showing this film.)

Moreover, Goebbels himself was also taken by it (which did not always mean the same than pleasing the critics). On 11 December 1935 he wrote in his diary, "an exciting and adorable film with (Hans) Albers."

After the war, it was banned by the Allies.

Cast

References 
Klaus, Ulrich J.: German soundfilms. Film encyclopedia of full-length German and German-speaking sound films, sorted by their German first showings. - Ulrich J. Klaus. - Berlin [et al.] (Klaus-archive, Vol. 4. - 1935.)

External links
 

Films of Nazi Germany
1935 films
Films directed by Johannes Meyer
Films set in 1918
Films set in 1919
Russian Civil War films
German black-and-white films
German war drama films
1935 romantic drama films
1930s war drama films
German romantic drama films
1930s German films